Cavalier is the largest city in Pembina County, North Dakota, United States. It is the county seat of Pembina County. The population was 1,246 at the 2020 census. Cavalier was founded in 1875 and became the county seat in 1911.

Although they bear the same name, Cavalier is not located in nearby Cavalier County. The Tongue River flows past Cavalier and Cavalier Air Force Station is located near the city.

History

Cavalier was laid out in 1875 on open land. The city was named for Charles Cavileer, an early settler in Pembina County (a recording error accounts for the error in spelling, which was never corrected). A post office has been in operation at Cavalier since 1877. Cavalier was incorporated in 1902.

In the early 1970s, the city of Cavalier's population quadrupled in size due to the U.S.' anti ballistic missile program. This was in preparation of a nuclear attack on the U.S. during the Cold War with the Soviet Union.

Geography and climate

Cavalier is located at  (48.795416, −97.623259).

Cavalier has a warm-summer humid continental climate (Koppen: Dwb). Summers are warm, sometimes hot, while winters are very cold, sometimes severely cold. Precipitation is mostly confined to late spring into early fall and peaks in June. Winter is very dry with little precipitation, almost always in the form of snow.

Demographics

2010 census
As of the census of 2010, there were 1,302 people, 641 households and 333 families living in the city. The racial makeup of the city was 95.4% White, 2.2% Native American, 0.2% Asian, 0.2% Pacific Islander, 0.2% from other races, and 1.9% from two or more races. Hispanic or Latino of any race were 2.7% of the population.

There were 641 households, of which 19.8% had children under the age of 18 living with them, 40.9% were married couples living together, 8.9% had a female householder with no husband present, 2.2% had a male householder with no wife present, and 48.0% were non-families. 43.2% of all households were made up of individuals, and 18.1% had someone living alone who was 65 years of age or older. The average household size was 1.95 and the average family size was 2.69.

The median age in the city was 47.3 years. 18.5% of residents were under the age of 18; 8% were between the ages of 18 and 24; 19.6% were from 25 to 44; 26.2% were from 45 to 64; and 27.6% were 65 years of age or older. The gender makeup of the city was 47.5% male and 52.5% female.

2000 census
As of the census of 2000, there were 1,537 people, 679 households and 399 families living in the city. The population density was 1,938.1 per square mile (751.2/km). There were 750 housing units at an average density of 945.7 per square mile (366.6/km). The racial makeup of the city was 94.27% White, 0.46% African American, 1.04% Native American, 0.52% Asian, 2.08% from other races, and 1.63% from two or more races. Hispanic or Latino of any race were 4.29% of the population.

There were 679 households, of which 26.7% had children under the age of 18 living with them, 50.4% were married couples living together, 6.3% had a female householder with no husband present, and 41.1% were non-families. 38.4% of all households were made up of individuals, and 21.8% had someone living alone who was 65 years of age or older. The average household size was 2.17 and the average family size was 2.92.

22.8% of the population were under the age of 18, 7.2% from 18 to 24, 24.3% from 25 to 44, 21.0% from 45 to 64, and 24.8% who were 65 years of age or older. The median age was 42 years. For every 100 females, there were 88.8 males. For every 100 females age 18 and over, there were 85.8 males.

The median household income was $35,667 and the median family income was $48,450. Males had a median income of $30,313 compared with $21,548 for females. The per capita income for the city was $19,586. About 7.8% of families and 9.3% of the population were below the poverty line, including 7.0% of those under age 18 and 9.9% of those age 65 or over.

Based on data from the 2000 Census, 6.8% of Cavalier's population is of Icelandic ancestry, making Cavalier the city with the highest proportion of Icelandic residents in the United States.

Sites of interest
 Icelandic State Park is a public recreation area located on Renwick Dam five miles (8.0 km) west of Cavalier in Akra Township, Pembina County, North Dakota. It includes Lake Renwick and the Gunlogson Arboretum Nature Preserve, which are used for various recreation activities. 
 
 Frost Fire Ski and Snow Board Area is located outside of nearby Walhalla, North Dakota and includes tubing and an outdoor amphitheater. 
 The Cavalier Air Force Station is located about 14 miles Southwest of Cavalier. It was built in the early 1970s. It provides critical missile warning and space surveillance data to various government agencies. Approximately 30 military along with several civil service people are stationed on the base.
 The Pembina Gorge State Recreation Area is a unit of the North Dakota state park system located along the Pembina River that provides a  looped trail for hiking as well as riding ATVs, dirt bikes and snowmobiles.
 Built in 1912, the Pembina County Courthouse was listed on the National Register of Historic Places in 1980.
 The Historic Cavalier Movie Theater
 Pembina County Memorial Hospital
 Cavalier Country Club
 Cavalier Arena
 Cavalier Swimming Pool

Events
The Cavalier Motorcycle Ride-In occurs every Father's Day weekend and brings in thousands of motorcycles and spectators from the upper midwest and Canada. This event has been called the "Little Sturgis of the North" and has been held every year for more than 20 years.   
Off The Charts Festival is a free Christian Music Festival held every August featuring national acts. 
The Pembina County Fair has been held annually in nearby Hamilton, North Dakota for more than 125 years.

Notable people

 Ashley Ford, Miss North Dakota 2004
 Rob Hunt, selected by the Indianapolis Colts in the fifth round of the 2005 NFL Draft
 John Kobs, men's baseball, basketball, and ice hockey coach at Michigan State University (1924–1963)
 Rodney Scott Webb, federal judge

Media
The Cavalier Chronicle, a weekly news publication which began operation in 1885, is the oldest business in Cavalier. It is the official newspaper of Pembina County.

Education

Cavalier Public School

The city of Cavalier is served by Cavalier Public School (K–12). The 2017–2018 K–12 fall enrollment was 411. The school's athletic teams are known as the Tornadoes. Team colors are orange and black.

High school championships
 North Dakota Class B high school baseball: 2002, 2003, 2004
 North Dakota Class B high school football: 1987
 North Dakota Class AA high school football: 2002, 2003, 2004
 North Dakota Class B 9-man football: 2013, 2014

From 2002 to 2005, the Cavalier Tornadoes football team, led by coach Rod Oksendahl (1978–2005), had a 47-game winning streak, the second longest winning streak in North Dakota high school football history. The streak ended when the Tornadoes lost to the Velva-Sawyer Aggies in the 2005 State Class 'A' championship game.

External links

 City of Cavalier official website
 City of Cavalier Main Street Web Cam
 Cavalier Public School official website
 Pioneer Women's Histories: Cavalier from the Digital Horizons website

Notes

Cities in North Dakota
Cities in Pembina County, North Dakota
County seats in North Dakota
Icelandic-American culture in North Dakota
Populated places established in 1875
1875 establishments in Dakota Territory